The Sisu A2045 HMTV (High Mobility Terrain Vehicle) is a Finnish standard medium tactical truck, intended to replace older SISU A45 "Proto" light trucks in the Finnish Defence Forces. In spoken language Sisu A2045 is called the MAN-Sisu referring to the engine, axles and other elementary parts delivered by the German lorry manufacturer MAN Nutzfahrzeuge, officially MAN SE, former MAN AG. For the personal transportation on the installed seats, twelve persons can travel outside the driver's cabin. The lorry is classified by its weight as a middle off-road logistic vehicle.

The trucks are used for general logistics and conscript training, as well as for towing artillery pieces, anti-aircraft weapons and command modules.

Sisu A2045 is the successor of Sisu A-45, Sisu AH-45 and Sisu KB-45. The A2045 was introduced at the Security and Defence 2008 exhibition in Lahti, Finland.

Operators
: The Finnish Defence Forces has ordered 232 4×4 vehicles for delivery 2009-2010. It has also an option for an additional 240 vehicles to be bought after 2010.

References

External links 

Sisu A2045 gallery at Sisua.net
Description of Sisu A2045 at Finnish Defence Forces website

A2045
Military trucks of Finland
Post–Cold War military vehicles of Finland
Military vehicles introduced in the 2000s
Vehicles introduced in 2008